Cockburn Sound (Nyungar Aboriginal Australian name: Derbal Nara) is an inlet of the Indian Ocean on the coast of Western Australia.  It extends from the south of the mouth of the Swan River at Fremantle for about 25 km to Point Peron near Rockingham. The total area of the sound is about 100 km2.

It is bounded on the east by the mainland council areas of Cockburn and Kwinana, on the west by Garden Island and Carnac Island, and includes several rocky outcrops and reefs.  The Gage Roads shipping channel lies to the north.

The sound was named in 1827 by Captain James Stirling, probably after Admiral Sir George Cockburn.

The Perth Seawater Desalination Plant can be found here.

Water pollution 
Several media reports have been made on pollution of the water in Cockburn Sound, where in late 2015 an estimated 2,100 fish died as a result of algal blooms through poor local water quality.

Reports from 2010 suggest the monitoring of pollutants was not adequate, using degradation of sea-grass since 2005 as a key indicator.

Media coverage in December 2016 indicates the leaking of firefighting chemicals from the local defence base at Garden Island could be a factor, however the report was only made available in September 2016. Prior official reports indicate the water quality was improving. However, there is doubt towards the scope of the report, as it does not include factors such as thermal stress from increased water temperature and oxygen stress as a result of climate change and localised desalination.

See also
 Kwinana
 Success Bank

References

External links

 Cockburn Sound Management Council Annual Report from 2005

 
Bodies of water of the Indian Ocean